Harry James Sharper Jr. (born November 23, 1974) is a former American football linebacker and coach who is currently the Linebackers coach for the DC Defenders of the XFL. Sharper played in the National Football League (NFL) for nine seasons, and played college football at Virginia. He was selected by the Baltimore Ravens in the second round of the 1997 NFL Draft. Sharper spent five seasons in Baltimore, where he was part of the team that won the franchise's first Super Bowl in Super Bowl XXXV. In 2002, he was selected by the Houston Texans in their expansion draft and played three seasons with the team. During his final season in 2005, Sharper was a member of the Seattle Seahawks. He is the older brother of former safety Darren Sharper.

Career
Sharper attended Hermitage High School in Henrico County, Virginia. He played for the school's American football team as a linebacker. His younger brother, Darren, played for the football team as a quarterback. After high school, Sharper enrolled at the University of Virginia, and played college football for the Virginia Cavaliers.

The Baltimore Ravens selected Sharper with the 34th overall pick in the 1997 NFL Draft. He made an impact right away, recording 68 tackles, three sacks and one interception in his rookie year. He became an important part in the record-setting 2000 Ravens defense, making a crucial interception which sent Baltimore to the Super Bowl, and he started in Super Bowl XXXV. His career totals with the Ravens included 328 tackles, 14 sacks, 2 interceptions and one touchdown. After the 2001 season he was chosen in the expansion draft by the Houston Texans. From 2003-2004, while a member of the Texans, he led the NFL in tackles in that period with 301. After the 2004 season he signed with the Seattle Seahawks for one season, helping the team reach their first Super Bowl. Sharper then retired after one season with Seattle due to a knee injury. During his 9-year career Sharper only missed 8 games, and did not miss a game until his final season, playing in 136 straight games.

Post-playing career
Jamie Sharper joined the coaching staff at St. Augustine High School in New Orleans and served as Linebackers coach from 2016-2018. He joined the Georgetown University football program in August 2018 as the assistant linebackers coach and held that position until 2021. From 2021-2022, he served as the Defensive Line coach.

Sharper was hired by the DC Defenders on September 13, 2022.

References

1974 births
Living people
African-American players of American football
American football linebackers
Baltimore Ravens players
Houston Texans players
Players of American football from Richmond, Virginia
Seattle Seahawks players
Virginia Cavaliers football players